The 1992 Sun Belt Conference men's basketball tournament was held March 4–8, 1992 at the Mississippi Coast Coliseum in Biloxi, Mississippi.

 defeated top-seeded  in the championship game, 75–71, to win their first Sun Belt men's basketball tournament.

The Ragin' Cajuns, in turn, received an automatic bid to the 1992 NCAA tournament. Fellow Sun Belt member Louisiana Tech joined them in the tournament, earning an at-large bid.

Format
The Sun Belt saw some drastic membership changes before the 1991–92 season. Five long-time members departed the conference: UAB joined the Great Midwest, Old Dominion joined the CAA, and South Florida, UNC Charlotte, and VCU joined the Metro Conference. In turn, eight new teams were added: Arkansas–Little Rock, Arkansas State, Central Florida, Lamar, Louisiana Tech, New Orleans, Southwestern Louisiana, and Texas–Pan American. Most came from the newly-defunct American South Conference while UALR came over from the Trans-America Athletic Conference.

In turn, the tournament format saw its own changes. Firstly, the tournament field expanded from eight to eleven teams. With all teams seeded based on regular-season conference records, the top five teams were given byes into the quarterfinal round while the bottom six teams were placed into the preliminary first round.

Bracket

See also
American South Conference men's basketball tournament (1988–1991)
Sun Belt Conference women's basketball tournament

References

Sun Belt Conference men's basketball tournament
Tournament
Sun Belt Conference men's basketball tournament
Sun Belt Conference men's basketball tournament